Fadā'iyān-e Islam (also spelled as Fadayan-e Islam or in English "Fedayeen of Islam" or "Devotees of Islam" or literally "Self-Sacrificers of Islam") is a Shia fundamentalist group in Iran with a strong activist political and allegedly terrorist, orientation.
The group was founded in 1946, and registered as a political party in 1989. It was founded by a theology student nicknamed Navvab Safavi. Safavi sought to purify Islam in Iran by ridding it of 'corrupting individuals' by means of carefully planned assassinations of certain leading intellectual and political figures. The group executed a series of successful killings (author Ahmad Kasravi, court minister (and former prime minister) Abdolhossein Hazhir, the Prime Minister Haj Ali Razmara, the former education minister Abdul Hamid Zangeneh) and attempted killings (the Shah of Iran, foreign minister Hossein Fatemi) and succeeded in freeing of some of its assassins from punishment with the help of the group's powerful clerical supporters. But eventually the group was suppressed and Safavi executed by the Iranian government in the mid-1950s. The group survived as supporters of the Ayatollah Khomeini and the Iranian Revolution.

Background

The group was part of a "growing nationalist mobilization against foreign domination" in the Middle East after World War II, and has been said to presage more famous Islamist terrorist groups. Its membership is said to have been made up of youth employed in "the lower echelons of the Tehran bazaar." Its program went beyond generalities about following the sharia to demand prohibitions of alcohol, tobacco, opium, films, gambling, wearing of foreign clothing, the enforcement of amputation of hands of thieves, and the veiling of women, and an elimination from school curriculum of all non-Muslim subjects such as music.

History

Rise
Its first assassination was of a nationalist, anti-clerical author named Ahmad Kasravi, who was stabbed and killed in 1946. Kasravi is said to have been the target of Ayatollah Khomeini's demand in his first book, Kashf al Asrar (Key to the Secrets), that "all those who criticized Islam" are mahdur ad-damm, (meaning that their blood must be shed by the faithful). Secularist Iranian author Amir Taheri argues that Khomeini was closely associated with Navvab Safavi and his ideas, and that Khomeini's assertion "amounted to a virtual death sentence on Kasravi."

Hussein Emami, the assassin and a founding member of the Fada'iyan, was promptly arrested and sentenced to death for the crime. The Iranian intelligentsia united in calling for an example to be made of him. Emami, however, was spared the gallows. According to Taheri, he roused religious defenders and used his prestige as a seyyed, or descendant of the Islamic prophet Muhammad, to demand he be tried by a religious court. Khomeini and many of the Shia clergy pressured the Shah to give Emami a pardon, taking advantage of the Shah's political difficulties at that time, such as the occupation of Azerbaijan province by Soviet troops.   Khomeini himself asked the Shah for the pardon.

In November 1949 the group killed court minister (and former prime minister) Abdolhossein Hazhir. On 7 March 1951, the Prime Minister Haj Ali Razmara was assassinated, in retaliation for his advice against nationalizing the oil industry. Three weeks later the former education minister Abdul Hamid Zangeneh was assassinated by the group. Razmara's assassination was said to have moved Iran "further away from a spirit of compromise and moderation in relation to the oil problem" and "so frightened the ruling classes that concession after concession was made to nationalist demands in an attempt to pacify the intensely aroused public indignation." An assassination attempt on Shah Mohammad Reza Pahlavi, on 4 February 1949, was carried out by Fakhr-Arai; Fakhr-Arai was first attributed to be a member of the communist Tudeh Party of Iran, but he was later found to more likely be a religious fundamentalist member of Fada'iyan-e Islam.

In addition to Emami, Khalil Tahmasebi, the assassin of Razmara, was also pardoned by the Iranian Parliament during the premiership of Mohammad Mossadegh. Ayatollah Abol-Ghasem Kashani, a powerful member of parliament and a supporter of the Fadayan, "arranged for a special Act to be passed quashing the death sentence on Tahamsebi and declaring him (Tahamsebi) to be a soldier of Islam," to the further consternation of Iranian secularists. However, following the fall of Mossaddegh Tahmasebi was arrested again and tried in 1952. He was sentenced to death and executed in 1955. In addition, Ayatollah Kashani ended his alliance with Mossadegh and become close to the Shah after the assassination.

Although the Fada'iyan strongly supported the nationalization of Iran's foreign-owned oil industry, they turned against the leader of the nationalization movement, Mohammad Mossadeq, when he became prime minister, because of his refusal to implement sharia law and appoint strict Islamists to high positions.   The danger from the Fada'iyan "was one of the primary factors accounting for Mosaddeq's decision to move the prime minister's office to his own residence." Another assassination attempt on 15 February 1952 badly wounded Hossein Fatemi, "Mosaddeq's dynamic and capable aide" and foreign minister. That left Fatemi "badly wounded and effectively disabled for almost eight months." The attempted assassination was planned by the group's second in command, Abolhossein Vahedi, and carried out by a teenage member of the group.

Crackdown
In 1955, Navvab Safavi and "other members of the Fedayeen of Islam, including Emami," were finally executed. The group continued however, turning, according to author Baqer Moin, to Ayatollah Khomeini as a new spiritual leader, and reportedly being "reconstructed" by Khomeini disciple, and later controversial "hanging judge," Sadegh Khalkhali. It is thought to have carried out the assassination of Iranian Prime Minister Hassan Ali Mansour in 1965. Mansour is reported to have been "tried" by a secret Islamic court, made up of Khomeini followers Morteza Motahhari and Ayatollah Mohammad Beheshti, and sentenced to death "on a charge of 'warring on Allah' as symbolized by the decision" to send Khomeini into exile.  The three men who carried out the "sentence" - Mohammad Bokara'i, Morteza Niknezhad and Reza Saffar-Harandi - "were arrested and charged as accomplices", but the story of both the trial and the sentence was not revealed until after the revolution.

Revolution and Islamic Republic
During the 1979 Iranian Revolution, some of the Fada'iyan's objectives were practiced by Islamic Republic of Iran, though in a modified way. Meaning there are similarities between Islamic Republic of Iran and Fada'iyan's views on issues like Islamic justice, the right of minorities and women, the place of poor, the cleric's position in the Islamic society, attitude toward foreign powers, etc. Fada'iyan's mentality in these issues is best served by some organizations in new Iran, such as Foundation of the Impoverished (Bonyād-e mostażʿafān), Revolutionary Guard (Sepāh-e pāsdārān-e enqelāb-e Eslāmī), the chair of the Discretionary Council (Šūrā-ye maṣleḥat-e neẓām), etc.

Members of the group 
These persons are main member of the group:
 Navab Safavi, leader of the group Fadayan-e Islam
 Mozafar Zolghadr: He was from Karasf city, in the Khodabandeh County, Zanjan Province. Mozafar was born in a rural and religious family. Mozafar Zolghadr decided to murder Hossein Ala' but his gun did not fire. After that he arrested and executed.
 Seyyed Muhammad Vahedi
 Khalil Tahmasebi, the member of Fada'iyan-e Islam who assassinated Iranian Prime Minister Haj Ali Razmara in March 1951.  He was described as a "religious fanatic" by The New York Times and was executed in 1955.
 Jafar Shojouni
 Seyyed Mehdi Tabatabaei

See also

 Terrorism in Iran

References

Further reading
 

Militant opposition to the Pahlavi dynasty
Organisations of the Iranian Revolution
Iranian neoconservatism
Islamist insurgent groups
1946 establishments in Iran
Political parties established in 1989
Principlist political groups in Iran
Shia Islamist groups
Secret societies
Islamic fundamentalism
Iranian clerical political groups